Kununurra is a town in far northern Western Australia located at the eastern extremity of the Kimberley approximately  from the border with the Northern Territory. Kununurra was initiated to service the Ord River Irrigation Scheme.

The town is situated in among the scenic hills and ranges of the far north-east Kimberley region, having an abundance of fresh water, conserved by the Ord River Diversion dam and the main Ord River Dam.

The tropical agriculture crops grown in the Ord River Irrigation Area (ORIA) have changed over the years. Tourism and mining have also become important to the local economy.

Characteristics 
Kununurra has a transient population; if itinerant residents, the outlying farm areas and communities were included in census population figures, it is estimated numbers would have exceeded 7,000 for 2006, as opposed to the actual figure of 5,619. An influx in the dry season (from April to September) of tourists and itinerant farm workers can push up the population to around 10,000.

Key farm activities include the growing of melons, mangoes and until recently, sugar cane. Farmers are now turning to a more lucrative (though longer term) crop of Indian sandalwood. Other crops that have been grown in the Ord are cotton, safflower and rice, which is being trialled once again, having been the first crop planted on the Pilot Farm in 1960. The town has a melon picking season, which attracts migratory farm workers to the area. There is also a thriving tourism industry with most tourist operators capitalising on the scenery of the Ord River, Lake Argyle, Diversion Dam and other local locations, including the relatively nearby Bungle Bungle Range.

History 

The history of the idea of agriculture on the Ord River dates from the 19th century. On the first pastoral lease map (held by WA State Records Office) for the area dated 1887, it shows the northern bank between Wyndham and Kununurra, near House Roof Hill was held as a "Concession for Sugar Cane Planting," although it was never taken up. The idea of tropical agriculture on the Ord was discussed much from the earliest dates, but the land remained under pastoral lease until 1960.
Kununurra was built on land resumed from Ivanhoe Station pastoral lease before 1961, as the town for the Ord River Irrigation Area which started as the Ord River Project or Ord Scheme, with survey work starting in 1959. Lake Kununurra is the flooded section of the Ord River valley that was formerly known as Carlton Reach, which was at times a  waterhole held back by the natural rock barrier known as Bandicoot Bar. At this site in 1959 drilling and blasting marked the start of construction of the Ord River Diversion Dam, which is anchored down onto the Bandicoot Bar. This dam with twenty radial flood gates was almost completed when visited by Queen Elizabeth II and Prince Philip in March 1963, then later completed and officially opened by then Prime Minister, Robert Menzies on 20 July 1963 when he said that Kununurra and the Ord River Irrigation Area (ORIA) is "... the most exciting place in Australia".

As well as the town site some ORIA farmers live on their farms; however the initial idea of the Ord Scheme was for "closer settlement" to allow farmers the convenience of living in the town and since the start of the first Pilot Farm in 1960 most farmers in the valley had lived in the town.  However, many people now live on their irrigation farms. Other agricultural and residential localities exist within a  radius of the town, including various Aboriginal Communities, Crossing Falls, the Riverfarm Road and Packsaddle farm areas, and the Frank Wise Institute of Tropical Agriculture, formerly known as the Kimberley Research Station (KRS). KRS started in 1945 from the original Carlton Reach Research Station, set up by Kimberley Michael Durack with help from his brother William Aiden Durack in 1941, and support from the WA Department of Agriculture and the WA Public Works Department, being the first serious attempt at tropical agriculture on the banks of the Ord River. It was also in 1941 that Russell Dumas inspected the Ord gorges for dam sites on behalf of the Public Works Department.

By 1966, there were 31 farms on the Ord River plains. In 1968 the second stage of the scheme was started with the building of the Ord River Dam (or Ord River Main Dam), known locally as "Top Dam," which holds back the waters of Lake Argyle.

The Ord River Dam flooded the land of the Argyle Downs station, the home station of the pioneering Durack family, to form what has become known as Lake Argyle. Stone work from the original Argyle Downs homestead, was removed before Lake Argyle filled and was re-erected near the dam site to become the Argyle Downs Homestead Museum. The Museum had been run by Tourism WA but was taken on by the Kununurra Visitor Centre during 2010.

The second stage of the Ord Project still has not been fully developed but new work is underway. In May 2010, with major funding from the Federal Government, the extension of the main channel construction got underway under the Moonamang Joint Venture.

Kununurra post office opened on 1 September 1960.

Population
According to the 2016 census of Population, there were 5,308 people in Kununurra.
 Aboriginal and Torres Strait Islander people made up 22.9% of the population. 
 71.8% of people were born in Australia. The next most common countries of birth were England 3.6% and New Zealand 2.1%.
 76.4% of people spoke only English at home. Other languages spoken at home included Miriwoong 2.2%. 
 The most common responses for religion were No Religion 38.8% and Catholic 19.0%.

Etymology
The name Kununurra is derived from the English pronunciation of the word  (alternatively ) which in the Miriwoong language means 'river'. It is a widespread myth that it means '(Meeting of) Big Waters' or 'Big River'. One also finds accounts of the name of Kununurra which state that it was the Miriwoong name for this part of the Ord River, which makes sense in that the Ord River runs for hundreds of kilometres coming from the south near Hall's Creek. It is stated to be likely that other parts of the Ord River were known by other Aboriginal language names, by the various tribal language group areas, over which the river traverses.

A 1943 soil classification had named the volcanic clay known locally as "blacksoil", being the predominant soil type of the irrigation area, as "Cununurra Clay" and "Cununurra" was put forward as a possible name, among others in 1960. The General Post Office (GPO) representative from WA on the Nomenclature Committee, objected saying that Cununurra was too close in name to the town of Cunnamulla and that could cause postal confusion. A compromise was reached and "K" was used with an argument having been put forward that this would bring it into line with other East Kimberley placenames, such as Kalumburu, and Karunjie. The name was only finally decided just days before the newest town of the Kimberley region, being gazetted on 10 February 1961.

Geography
The landscape surrounding Kununurra includes features such as Valentine Spring, Black Rock Creek and Middle Springs along with many other waterfalls and swimming holes. Popular fishing spots include Ivanhoe Crossing, The Diversion Dam, Buttons Crossing, and various locations along the Dunham and Ord Rivers.

The town is located close to the confluence of the Ord and the Dunham River.

The town lies within the Ord Irrigation Area Important Bird Area (IBA), so identified by BirdLife International because of its importance for wild birds, especially estrildid finches.

Climate
Like other areas in the tropics of Western Australia, Kununurra experiences a semi-arid climate (Köppen climate classification BSh) with distinct wet and dry seasons; it borders closely on the tropical savanna climate (Aw).

The dry season from April to September is the most popular time to visit: heat and humidity are lower, and road and park accessibility at their best. In the town's 53 years of weather records, rainfall of over  has never been recorded in August, with most Augusts being completely rainless.

The build-up season from October to December is characterised by high heat and humidity. The oppressive conditions of the build-up often give way to spectacular electrical storms, along with dramatic lightning displays over the rugged Kimberley landscape. Such storms however bring little rain, and the lightning will often start bushfires in the surrounding scrub.

The summer monsoon period between January and March often causes accessibility issues, and the closure of many roads and national parks, due to heavy rain. Days are overcast and hot; heavy downpours are a frequent occurrence.

Popular culture 
Kununurra has a Celebrity Tree Park with many trees planted by famous people including Rolf Harris, and more recently Baz Luhrmann, after the majority of the filming for his film Australia was conducted just outside Kununurra. The town has many local attractions, including waterfalls, gorges and ranges. It was voted the second best town to live in Australia for outdoor adventure by Outdoor Australia magazine in the March/April 2007 edition.

Nicole Kidman feels that the area's water helped her get pregnant while filming in this town, stating "seven babies were conceived out of this film and only one was a boy. There is something up there in the Kununurra water because we all went swimming in the waterfalls, so we can call it the fertility waters now."

Media
Since 1980 Kununurra has been the base of the Kimberley Echo founded by the late James O'Kenny and Brian Cole. Radio station 6WR broadcasts across the Kimberley area from Kununurra on 693 AM, 101.1 FM, 101.3 FM, 102.1 FM, and 104.3 FM. 6WR also streams live online, and is available via the 'VAST' service to remote and blackspot areas of Australia on the Optus C1 satellite. Reach Beyond Australia broadcasts via shortwave from Kununurra between 9.7 and 15.3 MHz with evening releases in English and many Asian languages.

Facilities

Legal
The new Kununurra Courthouse, which includes a magistrate and a jury courtroom, was opened on 26 October 2014. It was designed by TAG Architects and Iredale Pedersen Hook Architects. The paintings of the Aboriginal artists from Miriwoong country were included in the design of the building.

Education
East Kimberley College has a student population of just over 900 ranging from kindergarten to year 12. St Joseph's Primary School and Ngalangangpum School are two Catholic schools. There is limited tertiary education available via a Western Australia North Regional Technical and further education (TAFE) campus.

Health
Kununurra District Hospital houses 32 beds and a 10-bed aged care facility. There are dental practices in the town.

Community
The Kununurra Leisure Centre is a multi-purpose, community recreation facility catering for a wide range of sports, recreation activities and social functions. It includes a  pool.

Kununurra Neighbourhood House is a not-for-profit community centre that provides various services and activities for the residents of Kununurra. Some of the services offered by Kununurra Neighbourhood House include family support, playgroups, parenting programs, emergency relief, referrals and advocacy. The centre also hosts events such as markets, workshops, festivals and fundraisers. Kununurra Neighbourhood House is open to the community between 8 am and 1 pm Monday to Friday.

Kununurra Youth Hub currently run by Police Citizens Youth Club (PCYC) to the community between 8 am and 5 pm daily.

Transport
East Kimberley Regional Airport, commonly referred to as Kununurra Airport, is located 3.7 km (2.3 mi) west of the town centre. Heavy wet seasons often result in this area being cut off from essential outside services and deliveries. The airport is a crucial piece of infrastructure which enables people and goods to enter or leave from the region and especially supports tourism and economic development.

See also 
Argyle diamond mine
El Questro Wilderness Park

References

External links
Kununurra Visitor Centre
ABC Local Radio - Kimberley
Shire of Wyndham East Kimberley
Kununurra Historical Society Inc. Archive, Library, Museum & Research for a "Photographic Journey on the Ord."

Ord River
Kununurra, Western Australia